La Planète des singes, known in English as Planet of the Apes in the US and Monkey Planet in the UK, is a 1963 science fiction novel by French author Pierre Boulle. It was adapted into the 1968 film Planet of the Apes, launching the Planet of the Apes media franchise.

The novel tells the tale of three human explorers from Earth who visit a planet orbiting the star Betelgeuse, in which great apes are the dominant intelligent and civilized species, whereas humans are reduced to a savage animal-like state.

Plot
In a frame story, a rich couple sailing alone in space, Jinn and Phyllis, rescue and translate a manuscript from a floating bottle. The manuscript was written by journalist Ulysse Mérou, who in 2500 was invited by wealthy Professor Antelle to accompany him and his disciple, physician Arthur Levain, to Betelgeuse. Because they travel close to the speed of light, time dilation causes centuries to pass on Earth during their two years in transit. They land their shuttle on a temperate, lushly forested planet which they name Soror (Latin for sister). They can breathe the air, drink the water and eat the fruit. Attracted by a woman whom they call Nova, they swim below a scenic waterfall. She is frightened by their pet chimpanzee, Hector, and strangles it. Her tribe, who exhibit the behavior of dumb animals, wreck the newcomers' clothing and shuttle.

Gorillas, fully dressed as hunters, attack the tribe with firearms. Many are killed, including Arthur. Ulysse is captured with the survivors and brought to a city populated by apes. Ape clothing matches that of 20th century Earth humans, except that the apes wear gloves instead of shoes on their prehensile feet. The apes smoke tobacco, photograph their hunting trophies, drink through straws and appear utterly civilized. Their society is divided into three strata: aggressive gorilla police and military, conservative orangutan politicians and religious authorities, and liberal chimpanzee scientists.

In an urban biological research facility, Ulysse recognizes conditioning methods being used on captured humans. He is mated with Nova. Curious chimpanzee researcher Zira takes an interest in his geometric drawings and his ability to speak a few simian words. With help from Zira's fiancé, Cornélius, Ulysse makes a speech in front of several thousand apes. He is granted freedom and is given tailored clothing. Antelle reverts to primitive humanity in the zoo and is moved to the laboratory for safety, where he is mated to a young female.

Cornélius, an archaeologist, excavates an ancient human city. An unconscious human lab subject recites from racial memory the events that led to the fall of human civilization: humans tamed apes and eventually used them as servants. As apes learned to talk, a cerebral laziness took hold of the humans. Apes gradually took over human homes, driving the humans into camps outside of the cities. In the final memory, apes attacked the last human camp, carrying only whips.

Nova bears Ulysse a son, Sirius, who walks and talks at three months. Fearing for their lives, they take the place of the human test subjects in a space flight experiment. Because all humans look alike to apes, they are able to escape without notice and they rendezvous with the orbiting ship. Ulysse programs the ship back to Earth. As they fly over Paris, Orly Airport and the Eiffel Tower look the same. When they land, however, they are greeted by a field officer in a Jeep who is a gorilla. It is subsequently revealed, via the frame story, that Jinn and Phyllis are actually civilized chimpanzees, and they discard Ulysse's story as sheer fantasy because they find the idea of intelligent humans unbelievable.

Publication history

The novel was published in France in 1963 by Éditions Julliard.

The first English language version, with a translation by Xan Fielding, was published in the United States by Vanguard Press in June 1963 under the title Planet of the Apes.

In January 1964, it was published in the United Kingdom as Monkey Planet by Secker & Warburg of London, then re-issued as Planet of the Apes in August 1973 to tie it in to the film franchise it inspired.

The first paperback edition was published in the US in March 1964 by Signet / New American Library.

In May 1964, Saga: The Magazine For Men printed an abridged version of the novel.

Adaptations
The novel inspired a media franchise consisting of nine films, two television series (one animated), a behind the scenes documentary, and several comic books.

The first film was Planet of the Apes (1968), a science fiction feature film directed by Franklin J. Schaffner from a screenplay by Michael Wilson & Rod Serling and starring Charlton Heston. The film was a critical and commercial success, spawning four sequels on a one-film-a-year basis between 1970 and 1973.

A second adaptation of the book was released in 2001 directed by Tim Burton as a loose remake of the 1968 film of the same name. A series reboot with a new production team called Rise of the Planet of the Apes was released in 2011 to critical and commercial success. It was the first in a new series of films.

See also

 Ape and Essence
 Genus Homo
 "Living Fossil"
 Les Animaux dénaturés
 "No Connection"

References

Further reading

External links
 

1963 French novels
Fiction set around Betelgeuse
French-language novels
French science fiction novels
1963 science fiction novels
French fantasy novels
Fiction set in the 26th century
Vanguard Press books
French novels adapted into films
Planet of the Apes
Fiction about alien zoos
Novels adapted into comics
French novels adapted into television shows
Novels adapted into video games